Japonia hispida is a species of land snail with opercula, terrestrial gastropods in the family Cyclophoridae. This species is endemic to Japan.

References

Molluscs of Japan
Cyclophoridae
Gastropods described in 1982
Taxonomy articles created by Polbot